Proximo Spirits, Inc., is an American spirits importer and international distributor based in Jersey City, New Jersey. It is best known for importing and distributing Jose Cuervo, the world's largest-selling tequila brand.

History
Proximo Spirits was founded in 2007 by the Beckmann family of Mexico, who also owns and operates Jose Cuervo. Proximo owns over a dozen spirits brands, including 1800 Tequila, Three Olives Vodka, Kraken Black Spiced Rum and Boodles British Gin, as well as craft spirits such as Hangar 1 Vodka and Stranahan's Colorado Whiskey. In a deal announced in March 2013, Proximo took over the Jose Cuervo distribution rights from Diageo on July 1, 2013, with plans to increase spending on marketing and innovations. London-based Proximo Spirits UK was launched in July 2013.

Within its first five years of operations, Proximo vastly increased the size of 1800 Tequila, Three Olives Vodka and Kraken Rum. In 2012, 1800 Tequila was up 15% in sales from the previous year, and up 73% since 2009. Three Olives grew 18% from 2009 to 2011. Kraken Rum was launched in 2010 and went up 50% from 2011 to 2012. As of 2013, Proximo distributes approximately 6 million total cases per year.

Both Proximo and Cuervo are controlled by the Beckmann family of Mexico, descendants of Jose María Guadalupe de Cuervo.

Brands

Tequila
 Jose Cuervo (all varieties, 35-40% abv)
 1800 Tequila (all varieties, 35-50% abv)
 Gran Centenario (premium small batch 100% blue agave tequila, 38% abv)
 Maestro Dobel Tequila (a clear 100% blue agave blend of extra añejo, añejo and reposado tequilas, 40% abv)
 Zarco (in silver and gold varieties, 40% abv)

Vodka
 Three Olives Vodka (available unflavored and in a wide range of flavors, 35-40% abv)
 Hangar 1 Vodka (grape-based, fruit-infused vodka from California, 40% abv)

Rum
 Kraken Black Spiced Rum (Caribbean rum, 47% abv)
 Lola Belle Cherry Rum (Caribbean rum infused with maraschino cherries, 40% abv)
 Ron Matusalem Rum (Cuban rum produced in the Dominican Republic using the Solera aging process, 40% abv)

Whiskey
 Old Bushmills Distillery Irish Whiskey 
 Stranahan's Colorado Whiskey (the first legal whiskey distilled in Colorado, 47% abv)
 Tincup American Whiskey (whiskey made with a blend of corn, rye and malt, 42% abv)
 Proper No. Twelve (Irish whiskey partially owned by Conor McGregor 40% abv) 
Old Camp Whiskey (Created by country duo Florida Georgia Line - Peach Pecan Whiskey, 35% abv)
Wolf Moon Bourbon Whiskey (Created by country stars Jason Aldean and Florida Georgia Line - Straight Bourbon Whiskey made with a blend of corn, rye, and barley malt, 40% abv)
 Virginia Black Whiskey
Pendleton Canadian Whiskey
The Sexton Single Malt Irish Whiskey

Gin
 Boodles British Gin (London dry gin, 45.2% abv)

Liqueur
 Agavero (tequila liqueur made with 100% blue agave blended with various flavors, 32% abv)

Margaritas
 Jose Cuervo margarita mixes (all varieties, 0%-12.7% abv)

Marketing
Proximo signed marketing agreements with the Los Angeles Lakers in 2009 and the New York Knicks in 2010, to promote 1800 Tequila at their respective stadiums. Proximo's ad campaigns have featured actor Kiefer Sutherland for Jose Cuervo; actor Ray Liotta, actor Michael Imperioli and rapper Rick Ross for 1800 Tequila; actor Clive Owen and rapper Lil' Kim for Three Olives Vodka; and musician Perry Farrell for Maestro Dobel Tequila.

Milestones

References

External links 
 

Companies based in Jersey City, New Jersey
American companies established in 2007
Distilleries in New Jersey